You're the One is an American sitcom that aired on The WB from April 19 until May 3, 1998.

Premise
A landscape architect from the American South falls in love with a website designer from New York City, despite coming from different backgrounds and cultures.

Cast
 Cynthia Geary as Lindsay Metcalf
 Elon Gold as Mark Weitz
 Leo Burmester as Bo Metcalf
 Dori Brenner as Leonore Weitz
 Julie Dretzin as Robin Eichenbaum-Weitz
 Jayce Bartok as Kip Metcalf
 Troy Winbush as Howard

Episodes

References

External links
 
 
 

1998 American television series debuts
1998 American television series endings
1990s American sitcoms
English-language television shows
The WB original programming
Television series by Castle Rock Entertainment
Television shows set in New York City